Department of Industrial Training & Vocational Education, Haryana is a Ministry and department of the Government of Haryana  in India.

Description
This department came into existence when Haryana was established as a new state within India after being separated from Punjab. Abhimanyu Sindhu is the cabinet minister responsible for this department from October 2014. The department oversees  industrial and vocational training through Government of Haryana-owned  and privately owned  Industrial Training Institutes (ITI) in the state of Haryana.
 
The department has embarked on a project to upgrade the Industrial Training Institutes (ITI) in the state of Haryana into Center of Excellence (CoE)s.

See also
 Government of Haryana

References

Industrial Training and Vocational Education
Vocational education in India
Education in Haryana